This is a list of Members of Parliament elected at the 1935 general election, held on 14 November. Due to the onset of the Second World War, this was the last general election before 1945, making it the longest UK parliament in history and the longest parliament to sit in Westminster since the Cavalier Parliament of 1661–1679.

By-elections
See the list of United Kingdom by-elections.

History

 A declaration was made to Parliament 3 September 1939 by PM Neville Chamberlain that "this country is at war with Germany", as it had been since 9am that day upon the expiration of an unobserved deadline to cease German fire in Poland.
 The King commissioned a change in Administration on 10 May 1940, and Winston Churchill became Prime Minister on 13 May 1940 with a resolution "That this House welcomes the formation of a Government representing the united and inflexible resolve of the nation to prosecute the war with Germany to a victorious conclusion."
 On 29 January 1942, Clement Attlee's motion was voted,  "That this House has confidence in His Majesty's Government and will aid it to the utmost in the vigorous prosecution of the War," and passed by a margin of 464 Ayes to 1 Noe (Maxton, J.).
 A motion to censure the Government of Churchill, "That this House, while paying tribute to the heroism and endurance of the Armed Forces of the Crown in circumstances of exceptional difficulty, has no confidence in the central direction of the war," was defeated on 2 July 1942 by a count of 475 Noes to 25 Ayes.  Sir John Wardlaw-Milne was mover, and Mr. Aneurin Bevan was seconder.

See also
UK general election, 1935
List of parliaments of the United Kingdom

References

Whitaker's Almanacks for 1939 and 1944

1935
1935 United Kingdom general election
 List
UK MPs